The women's 3000 metres steeplechase event at the 2005 European Athletics U23 Championships was held in Erfurt, Germany, at Steigerwaldstadion on 14 and 16 July.

Medalists

Results

Final
16 July

Heats
14 July
Qualified: first 4 in each heat and 4 best to the Final

Heat 1

Heat 2

Participation
According to an unofficial count, 22 athletes from 17 countries participated in the event.

 (1)
 (1)
 (2)
 (1)
 (2)
 (1)
 (1)
 (3)
 (1)
 (1)
 (1)
 (1)
 (1)
 (1)
 (1)
 (2)
 (1)

References

3000 metres steeplechase
Steeplechase at the European Athletics U23 Championships